John Davy (by 1514 – 1560 or later), of Dorchester, Dorset, was an English politician.

He married a woman named Elizabeth.

He was a Member (MP) of the Parliament of England for Dorchester in November 1554.

References

Year of death missing
English MPs 1554–1555
Members of the Parliament of England for Dorchester
Year of birth uncertain